The 2017 UCI Mountain Bike World Cup was a series of races in Olympic Cross-Country (XCO), Cross-Country Eliminator (XCE), and Downhill (DHI). Each discipline had an Elite Men and an Elite Women category. There were also men's and women's under-23 categories in the XCO and junior men's and women's categories in the DHI. The cross-country series had six rounds and the downhill series had seven rounds.

The Cross-Country Eliminator (XCE) was included as a UCI World Cup discipline for the first time since 2014. The XCE schedule for 2017 had six rounds. The XCE World Cup events had previously been held alongside the XCO and DHI races, but in 2017 they were held as separate events.

The Junior Women's Downhill category was included as a World Cup discipline for the first time in 2017.

New regulations were introduced in 2017 to reduce the numbers of competitors in the UCI World Cup downhill events. The minimum number of UCI points required to compete in a World Cup was increased from 30 to 40. The field sizes for the downhill finals were reduced from 20 to 15 (plus protected riders) for the Elite Women and from 30 to 20 for the Junior Men.

Cross-country

Elite

Nino Schurter was the first Cross-country mountain biker to accomplish a Perfect season. Additionally he won at the World Championships the gold medal at the single and at the mixed race and the Cape Epic.

Under 23

Eliminator

Downhill

Elite

Junior

Series classification

Men

Women

References

See also
2017 UCI Mountain Bike World Championships

External links
 UCI Homepage
2017 MTB calendar on the UCI website

UCI Mountain Bike World Cup
Mountain Bike World Cup